Vicente de la Mata (born 2 July 1944) is an Argentine former football midfielder. He played most of his club career for Independiente and played for the Argentina national team between 1965 and 1966.

Playing career
Born in Rosario, De la Mata emerged from the youth team of Club Atlético Independiente. He won three Primera División Argentina titles in nine seasons with Independiente. He also helped Independiente win the Copa Libertadores twice.

In 1970, De la Mata moved abroad to play for Club Necaxa in the Primera División de México. He played one season with Necaxa, and then joined Deportivo Veracruz for five seasons. At the end of his career, he passed through Chile and then played one season in the Primera B Metropolitana with Argentino de Quilmes.

De la Mata made six appearances for the Argentina national football team, including one 1966 FIFA World Cup qualifier.

Personal
De la Mata's father, Vicente, was also an Argentine international footballer.

References

External links

1944 births
Living people
Argentine footballers
Argentine expatriate footballers
Argentina international footballers
Argentine Primera División players
Liga MX players
Club Atlético Independiente footballers
Club Necaxa footballers
C.D. Veracruz footballers
O'Higgins F.C. footballers
Chilean Primera División players
Expatriate footballers in Chile
Expatriate footballers in Mexico
Association football midfielders
Footballers from Rosario, Santa Fe